NHT may refer to:

 National historic trail, in the United States
 Natural Heritage Trust, an Australian government body
 Naval Historical Team, of the United States Navy
 NHT Airlines, a defunct Brazilian airline
 NHT Loudspeakers, an American electronics company
 Number theoretic Hilbert transform
 Ometepec Náhuatl language
 RAF Northolt, a Royal Air Force station in Greater London
 Union Station (Northampton, Massachusetts)